Associazione Calcio Rodengo Saiano was an Italian association football club located in Rodengo-Saiano, (BS), Lombardy Italy.

Their colors were yellow and blue.

History
The club was founded in 1983.

Four years in Lega Pro Seconda Divisione
In the Serie D 2006-07 season, Rodengo finished first in Girone D, thus winning promotion for the first time ever to Serie C2, the fourth tier of Italian football.  It participated in the Scudetto Dilettanti tournament but was eliminated in the group stage.

In the Serie C2 2007-08 regular season, Rodengo finished a surprising third in Girone A, and qualified for the promotional playoffs.  The team was defeated by fourth-placed Lumezzane in the semi-finals, 2–1 on aggregate, thus remaining in the, now called, Lega Pro Seconda Divisione for the 2008–09 season.

Also in the 2008–09 Lega Pro Seconda Divisione Rodengo finishing fourth in Girone A, is qualified for the promotional playoffs. The team was eliminated by third-placed Lumezzane in the semi-finals, 1–1 on aggregate, for the worst placement in the league, thus remaining in the, now called, Lega Pro Seconda Divisione for the 2009–10 season.

Instead in the 2009–10 Lega Pro Seconda Divisione Rodengo finishing only seventh in Girone A and eighth in the 2010–11 season.

The liquidation
It didn't join 2011–12 Lega Pro Seconda Divisione and excluded from all football.

References

External links
 Official Site 

Football clubs in Italy
Football clubs in Lombardy
Association football clubs established in 1983
Association football clubs disestablished in 2011
Serie C clubs
1983 establishments in Italy
2011 disestablishments in Italy